"Beers Ago" is a song co-written and recorded by American country music artist Toby Keith. It was released in March 2012 as the third and final single from his 2011 album Clancy's Tavern. Keith co-wrote the song with Bobby Pinson. A remixed version by DJ Jason Nevins also appears on the deluxe edition of Keith's sixteenth studio album Hope on the Rocks, released the following year. To date, this is Keith's last Top 10 hit.

Content
The song is a reminiscence about the narrator's teenage years, saying that they still seem like yesterday "[e]ven though / That was fourteen hundred and fifty-two beers ago".

Critical reception
Billy Dukes of Taste of Country gave the song three and a half stars out of five, writing that "his rapid-fire lyrics fit like pieces to a puzzle, with smart rhymes and imaginative references that captivate." Kevin John Coyne of Country Universe gave the song a B+ grade, saying that "there's a vibrancy to it because of Keith's skill as a vocalist."

Chart performance
"Beers Ago" debuted at number 56 on the U.S. Billboard Hot Country Songs chart for the week of March 24, 2012.

Year-end charts

Certifications

References

2012 singles
2011 songs
Toby Keith songs
Show Dog-Universal Music singles
Songs written by Toby Keith
Songs written by Bobby Pinson
Songs about alcohol